Epilachna tredecimnotata, the southern squash lady beetle, is a species of plant-eating lady beetle in the family Coccinellidae. It is found in the Caribbean Sea, Central America, North America, and South America.

References

Further reading

 

Coccinellidae
Articles created by Qbugbot
Beetles described in 1833